Lörtsy is a thin, half-moon shaped pastry originally invented in Savonlinna, eastern Finland. It can be made with a variety of fillings; the most common ones are either a savoury meat filling or a sweet apple filling.

A meat lörtsy contains a meat and rice filling similar to the Finnish meat pie. Street vendors may offer it with the same condiments as the meat pie, such as a pickled cucumber and chopped raw onion, and with an optional hot dog sausage. When served with condiments on the street, it is folded around them like a taco.

The apple lörtsy contains a sweet apple jam, and resembles a jam doughnut.

The lörtsy is associated with eastern Finland, particularly the region of Southern Savonia, but nowadays can be found all over Finland from street vendors and in some supermarkets.

See also

 Kalakukko

References

Finnish cuisine
Savoury pies
Sweet pies
Meat dishes
Deep fried foods
Fruit dishes